The Museum Vicente Pallotti is located on Avenida Presidente Vargas, 115 in Santa Maria, Rio Grande do Sul, Brazil. It is located in the same complex Palotina College (FAPAS). Visits need to be scheduled in advance.

Rooms
The museum has many rooms, with great emphasis on the area of paleontology, with fossils of geopark of paleorrota.

Mineralogy
Zoology
Hides and other
Birds
Snakes, insects and fish
Paleontology
War material
Archeology

History
In 1935, in the District of Vale-Vêneto, José Pivetta and Valentim Zamberlan started taxidermy in the museum, which is already part of the same collection.

In 1959, due to lack of space in Vale-Vêneto, the museum transferred to the College Máximo Palotino in Santa Maria. Moreover, in 1964, Daniel Cargnin, contributing to the museum in the college, collected various objects and fossils of geopark of paleorrota. On 7 January 1965, the museum received the first fossil, excavated in the Paleontological Site Sanga of Alemoa, near the town of Santa Maria. From this date, its growth continued, thanks especially to the efforts of Daniel Cargnin and Abraão Cargnin.

During the years 1972 to 1994, the museum personnel received several donations of the community in general and collections of sites: archaeological and palaeontological. During these years, the Museum Vicente Pallotti became a large repository of objects, and for this reason, the entire collection was in precarious conditions. Then in 1994, aiming to solve the difficulties, the museum was given its first phase of reorganization that continued until 1998. In 1998, work began on the second phase of reorganization.

External links
Museu Vicente Pallotti 

Museums established in 1935
Archaeological museums in Brazil
Geology museums in Brazil
Natural history museums in Brazil
Culture in Rio Grande do Sul
Museums established in 1959
Museums in Rio Grande do Sul
Fossil museums
1935 establishments in Brazil